Robert Priestley (June 12, 1901 – November 27, 1986) was an American set decorator. He won two Academy Awards and was nominated for another in the category Best Art Direction.

Selected filmography
Priestley won two Academy Awards for Best Art Direction and was nominated for another:
Won
 Picnic (1955)
 Sayonara (1957)
Nominated
 Marty (1955)

References

External links

1901 births
1986 deaths
American set decorators
Best Art Direction Academy Award winners
People from Manhattan